Finally Woken is the debut studio album by Welsh singer-songwriter Jem, released initially in the United States on 23 March 2004, with ATO Records.

Critical reception
Announced as America's biggest British female debut artist of 2004. Rolling Stone complimented her "sense of sonic humor".

Commercial reception
It has sold over 500,000 copies in the UK as of January 2009  and, as of 4 July 2009, had sold 332,000 copies in the United States, according to Nielsen SoundScan.

Track listing

Personnel
Jem Griffiths – vocals, executive production
Danny Griffin – bass
Justin Griffiths – acoustic guitar
Paul Herman – acoustic guitar
Nick Ingman – conductor, string arrangements
Israel Nachum – drums
Yoad Nevo – acoustic guitar, banjo, bass guitar, percussion, electric guitar, keyboard, sitar, double bass, Spanish guitar, mini harp, water bottle, co-production, mixing, mastering, recording
A. Cherry – photography (front cover)
Lloyd Gardiner – engineering
Ge-Ology – co-production
Michael Lavine – photography (booklet portraits)
Paul Topp – photography (back cover)

Charts

Certifications

References

2004 debut albums
Jem (singer) albums
ATO Records albums